Ice Cave Mountain is a summit located in Central New York Region of New York located in the Town of Ohio in Herkimer County, north of Wilmurt. The east side of the elevation drains into Ice Cave Creek.

References

Mountains of Herkimer County, New York
Mountains of New York (state)